Manuela Torazza (born ) is an Italian female weightlifter and former shot putter.

She competed in the 69 kg category and represented Italy at international competitions. She competed at world championship level, most recently at the 2006 World Weightlifting Championships.

Major results

See also
Italian all-time lists - Shot put

References

External links
 
 Manuela Torazza at TheSports.org

1968 births
Living people
Italian female weightlifters
Place of birth missing (living people)
Italian female shot putters
20th-century Italian women
21st-century Italian women